Ursula W. Goodenough (born March 16, 1943) is a Professor of Biology Emerita at Washington University in St. Louis were she engaged in research on eukaryotic algae.  She authored the textbook Genetics and the best-selling book The Sacred Depths of Nature, now in its second edition, and has presented the paradigm of the Religious Naturalist Orientation and the Epic of Evolution in numerous venues around the world. She contributed to the NPR blog, 13.7: Cosmos & Culture, from 2009 to 2011. She currently serves as president of the Religious Naturalist Association.

Background
Goodenough, daughter of Erwin Ramsdell Goodenough and Evelyn Goodenough Pitcher, earned a B.A. in Zoology from Barnard College in 1963, an M.A. in Zoology at Columbia University in 1965 and a Ph.D. in Biology at Harvard University in 1969. She was an assistant and associate professor of biology at Harvard from 1971 to 1978 before moving to Washington University. She wrote three editions of a widely adopted textbook, Genetics. She served as president of The American Society for Cell Biology in 1984–1985, was elected to the Cellular and Developmental Biology section of the American Academy of Arts and Sciences in 2009, was elected a Fellow of the American Society for Microbiology in 2013 and was awarded a Doctor of Letters Honoris Causa by the Meadville School of Theology in 2022.

Since 2013, Goodenough has been listed on the Advisory Council of the National Center for Science Education.

Goodenough joined the Institute on Religion in an Age of Science (IRAS) in 1989 and has served continuously on its council and as its president for four years. She has presented papers and seminars on science and religion to numerous audiences, co-chaired six IRAS conferences on Star Island, and serves on the editorial board of Zygon: Journal of Religion and Science.

Family
Goodenough has written that women balancing the demands of raising children and developing a career need to understand that they can do both. She says that realizing that a child's development is influenced by many people in their lives other than their mother has helped her achieve both her personal and professional goals. She is the mother of five children: Jason, Mathea, Jessica, Thomas, and James.

Goodenough's brothers are the solid-state physicist John B. Goodenough (born 1922), who is the oldest recipient of the Nobel Prize at age 97, the anthropologist Ward Goodenough (1919-2013), and the cell biologist Daniel Goodenough (1945- ).

Teaching
Goodenough taught a junior/senior level cell biology course at Washington University for many years. She also joined physicist Claude Bernard and earth-scientist Michael Wysession for 10 years in teaching a course called The Epic of Evolution directed at non-science majors. She has also taught graduate-level courses in microbial biology.

Dalai Lama
In 2002, Goodenough was a member of a five-scientist panel invited by the Mind and Life Institute as part of an ongoing series of seminars on Western science for Tenzin Gyatso, the 14th Dalai Lama and his inner circle of monk-scholars. Previous seminars explored particle physics and neuroscience. This was the Dalai Lama's first foray into cellular biology. Goodenough found him a quick study: "He's very interested in science and really wants to understand this stuff. We'd been told that he knew about DNA and proteins, but when I started it became clear that he had very little background. Of course, one is left to wonder how many of the world's leaders understand DNA proteins." Goodenough was joined by scientists Stuart Kauffman, Steven Chu and Eric Lander. Goodenough was invited back to Dharamsala, India to lecture again in 2003.

Research
Goodenough and colleagues have studied the molecular basis and evolution of life-cycle transitions in the flagellated green alga, Chlamydomonas reinhardtii. They have identified genes in the mating-type (mt) locus and genes regulated by mt that control the transition between vegetative growth and gametic differentiation and zygote development. These include genes responsible for mate recognition, uniparental inheritance of chloroplast DNA, and gametic differentiation, allowing analysis of their function and their evolution during speciation. They have also explored the potential for producing algal biodiesel as a transportation fuel.

References

External links

Religious Naturalist Association Board of Directors (Goodenough, President)

1943 births
Living people
21st-century American biologists
American spiritual writers
Harvard Graduate School of Arts and Sciences alumni
Religious naturalists
Washington University in St. Louis faculty
Presidents of the Institute on Religion in an Age of Science
Barnard College alumni
Columbia Graduate School of Arts and Sciences alumni
American women biologists
21st-century American women
Fellows of the American Academy of Arts and Sciences